West Hoe is an area of Plymouth in the English county of Devon.

History 

West Hoe is a Victorian era housing development built into the site of a quarry from which much limestone was taken for the city centre development of Plymouth.

Features 
West Hoe abuts Millbay harbour to the west and the Hoe promenade to the east. Much of the housing stock is used as lodging houses and bed and breakfast hotels.

The area features elegant buildings including the Grand Parade and the remnants of the old public steam baths beside West Hoe Basin which were briefly a yacht club and now a bar and restaurant.

LOOK II 

West Hoe Pier also features LOOK II, a permanent sculpture by British sculptor Antony Gormley.

References 

Suburbs of Plymouth, Devon